Sponsa Christi (The Spouse of Christ) is an Apostolic Constitution issued by Pope Pius XII on the Feast of the Presentation, November 21, 1950. It addresses the vocation of religious nuns.

Characteristics of the consecrated life
The first part of the constitution deals with the historical development of monastic women's monasteries from groups of consecrated virgins and widows of the early church, and in particular the contemplative life. Pius XII. describes the characteristics of the consecrated life of cloistered nuns, as this document was addressed to them.

For nuns the service of the liturgy is essential. The Word of God and the liturgy are the sources from which the nuns are to draw, to know the will of God and to bind themselves to him in freedom and in love. In the same part, the Pope sets out the provisions governing nuns' examinations. With this constitution fixed rules for religious communities are established.

Pope Pius cited Sponsa Christi in the March 25, 1954, encyclical Sacra Virginitas as showing the importance of the office consecrated men and women fulfill in the Church.

Foundations of Canon Law
The second part specifies the statutes valid according to canon law:
Article I. §§ 1-3 Establishment of religious orders for women
Article II. §§ 1-3 Special Forms of Monastic Religious Life
Article III. §§ 1-3 Affiliation and virgin consecration for eligible nuns
Article IV. §§ 1-5 Big and small papal examinations
Article V. §§ 1-4 Commitment to the public celebration of the Liturgy of the Hours in chorus
Article VI. §§ 1-3 Hierarchy and Order in Women's Monasteries
Article VII. §§ 1-3 Authorization procedure by the Holy See
Article VIII. §§ 1-3 Monastic work for the maintenance of the monasteries
Article IX. Final provisions and exhortatio for strict compliance with these regulations

By the June 29, 2016, Apostolic Constitution Vultum Dei quaerere (On the contemplative life in the Women's Order) Pope Francis repealed the Statuta generalia Monialium (General statutes concerning nuns).

References

External links
 Sponsa Christi

1950 documents
Documents of the Catholic Church
Pope Pius XII apostolic constitutions and bulls